The Rother Valley Railway (RVR) is a heritage railway project based at Robertsbridge in East Sussex, England. It takes its name from the original name for what later became the Kent and East Sussex Railway, running from Robertsbridge through to Headcorn in Kent, via Tenterden. The project is to replace the ‘missing link’ between Robertsbridge, a station on the Tonbridge to Hastings mainline, and Bodiam on the Kent and East Sussex Railway, a heritage railway which operates from Bodiam to Tenterden. A charity, supported by a society of volunteers, is attempting to re-establish the railway link. The RVR began by reinstating the first few hundred yards of line eastwards from Robertsbridge, and also a short stretch westwards from Bodiam. In 2010, the latter section was further extended to reach Junction Road. In summer 2011 work began at Robertsbridge to extend further eastwards to Northbridge Street, which entailed the rebuilding of five bridges. By June 2012, this further extension was also completed. In September 2013, a Gala weekend at Robertsbridge marked the progress to date and the start of the next phase - the re-instatement of the section between Northbridge Street and Junction Road, for which statutory permissions are being sought. While the RVR does not yet feature regular passenger trains, the base at Robertsbridge houses a small shop and visitor centre open to the public each Sunday,  utilising a building formerly used as the London terminus of the Orient Express. There is also a small collection of historic railway vehicles in various stages of preservation.

Origins
The Kent & East Sussex Railway Preservation Society was formed in 1961 following closure of the line by British Railways.

After many trials and tribulations, the Tenterden Railway Company Limited was incorporated in 1971 as a Company limited by guarantee and in 1973 was successful in purchasing that part of the line between Tenterden and Bodiam. The Tenterden Railway Company is now known as The Kent & East Sussex Railway (K&ESR), as of January 2004. The preservationists wanted to reopen the line through to Robertsbridge, but were refused permission by the then Transport Minister Barbara Castle to take over the section between Bodiam and Robertsbridge, despite taking the Minister to the High Court. The latter section was lifted and became abandoned in the mid 1970s. The reason for this refusal was the Ministry plan to build a by-pass to take the A21 around Robertsbridge.

K&ESR focussed efforts on the eastern end of the line. Trains first ran again on the Kent & East Sussex Railway on 3 February 1974 between Tenterden to Rolvenden, the line gradually being restored and extended in stages, reaching Wittersham Road in 1977, Northiam in 1990 and finally Bodiam on 2 April 2000, exactly 100 years to the day since the original opening of the line to passengers.

A separate Company, the Rother Valley Railway (East Sussex) Ltd, was formed on 22 May 1991 with the approval of the Tenterden Railway Company to reconstruct the railway between Bodiam and Robertsbridge and has since simplified its name to Rother Valley Railway Ltd. The plan is that K&ESR will operate this extended railway once completed, as its constitution provides. The main reasons for a separate organisation were to allow K&ESR to remain focussed on its existing activities, to avoid placing that activity at any financial risk, and to enable the new project to proceed with its own dedicated management team. Later it was able to achieve charity status, and is led by the Rother Valley Railway Heritage Trust.

Achievements

Since 1991, the Rother Valley Railway has been acquiring parts of the trackbed as and when possible. Negotiations continue with two remaining landowners to secure the remainder of the route. Planning permission was secured for its scheme at Robertsbridge, and the whole route is safeguarded in the Council's local plan. Liaison continues with the relevant authorities.

From 2009 to 2010 the RVR with help from K&ESR and volunteers were able to complete the  extension westwards from near Bodiam station, through Quarry Farm, to the B2244 (Junction Road). The first official train ran on the weekend of 19/20 March 2011. Attention then focussed on extending from Robertsbridge to Northbridge Street, and this was followed by work to recast the Robertsbridge section in readiness for the planned eventual join-up with K&ESR's track, once the necessary permissions have been obtained and construction completed. A gala weekend in 2013 saw a steam passenger train operating at Robertsbridge for the first time since the early 1960s, running up to Northbridge Street. December 2016 saw the reconnection of the RVR to the Network Rail system some 50 years after closure. Planning permission to reinstate the final section eastwards from Northbridge Street to Junction Road was granted in 2017.  RVR applied to the Secretary of State for a Transport and Works Act Order on 19 April 2018. Many representations for and against the scheme were submitted, and in June the Secretary of State for Transport announced that a public local inquiry would be held. This inquiry was scheduled to begin on 26 May 2020, was deferred, and eventually began in July 2021. It sat for 19 days and concluded on 3 September 2021. The Inspector will submit a report to the Secretary of State, with recommendations. The application will then be decided by the Secretary of State. In Spring 2019 work began to prepare the former trackbed between Austen's Bridge and Junction Road for tracklaying, this work being substantially completed by the end of 2020. This section was acquired by RVR, leaving just two stretches still to be acquired.

A small collection of rolling stock is stored at Robertsbridge, with several items undergoing active restoration. The RVR also owns a  steam locomotive, Charwelton, which works on the K&ESR but is currently under overhaul at Rolvenden. With the help of a grant from the Railway Heritage Trust RVR acquired and removed the railway turntable from Hither Green depot in 2020, and following refurbishment this has recently been  installed at Robertsbridge.

Rolling stock
The following locomotives are on site
"Titan", a Drewry  shunter, Vulcan Foundry works number D140.
"Dougal", a Drewry  shunter, Vulcan Foundry works number D77. 
 D2112, an ex-BR class 03  shunter.  
In addition are a number of other wagons and carriages undergoing or awaiting restoration.

Future plans

The Rother Valley Railway proposes to restore the missing rail link between Bodiam and Robertsbridge. There will be an end-on link with the Kent and East Sussex at Bodiam enabling through running. Trains will run into the Rother Valley Railway's own new station at Robertsbridge, the platform for which is now completed, together with a toilet block forming part of the planned new station building. The railway was reconnected to the Network Rail (NR) mainline in December 2016 to permit stock transfers, and use of the RVR by NR plant for training and other purposes; and the newly installed turntable can also be accessed.

Several bridges need to be rebuilt between Northbridge Street and Junction Road, and three road crossings made, including the A21 Robertsbridge by-pass. The proposal to build this road was the major reason preventing the acquisition from British Railways of this section of the railway by the Tenterden Railway Company in the 1960s, and the railway land was subsequently sold off to local farmers.  There has been some resistance from two landowners with regard to the proposed reinstatement, while the third missing section of route adjoining Junction Road has now been acquired by RVR Ltd and made ready for tracklaying.

On 16 March 2017, Rother District Council granted planning permission for the reinstatement of the line between Northbridge Street and Junction Road. In 2018, the RVR applied for a Transport and Works Act order which, if approved, would give the statutory powers to complete the reinstatement of the line and operate it. A public inquiry took place in the summer of 2021, and the Secretary of State's decision on the order is expected to be given when the inquiry report has been submitted. In April 2021, Rother District Council granted planning permission for the installation of the turntable at the Robertsbridge site, a few hundred yards north of the platform and next to the planned loco shed. This has now been installed (Spring 2023). Work is currently underway to widen the embankment adjacent to the turntable to provide a site for the planned loco shed.

See also
 Kent and East Sussex Railway
 Colonel Stephens
 From 1988 until the early 1990s, another "Rother Valley  Railway" had a brief existence on the site of  station near the River Rother in South Yorkshire. The line had three locomotives on loan, a five-ton steam crane and a membership of over eighty. Although the line featured in a two-page article in The Railway Magazine in 1990, little seems to have happened and the society faded away. After many years details have been published stating that the society was unable to gain agreement with the necessary local authorities, so was unable to proceed. They sought another opportunity elsewhere, which they found by taking over Cleethorpes Council's struggling miniature railway, turning it into the Cleethorpes Coast Light Railway in 1991. That "Rother Valley Railway Limited" was formally dissolved on 9 June 1992.

References

Notes

Sources

External links
 RVR Official Website
 KESR official website
 Col. Stephens Museum

Heritage railways in East Sussex
Minor British railway companies
Standard gauge railways in England